Pseudocnemodus canadensis is a species of dirt-colored seed bug in the family Rhyparochromidae. It is found in North America.

References

Rhyparochromidae
Articles created by Qbugbot
Insects described in 1886